Hera Lindsay Bird (born 31 December 1987) is a New Zealand poet.

Life and career
Hera Lindsay Bird was born and raised in Thames in the North Island of New Zealand. She attended Victoria University of Wellington and then received her Master's degree in poetry from its International Institute of Modern Letters. Her first collection of poetry, the self-titled Hera Lindsay Bird, was published by Victoria University Press in 2016 and Penguin UK in 2017 and won the Jessie Mackay Best First Book Award at the Ockham New Zealand Book Awards.

Bird first gained popularity when her poem "Keats Is Dead So Fuck Me From Behind" went viral in the summer of 2016. She and her work have since been profiled in VICE, I-D, and The Guardian.

In 2018 Bird's work was selected by British Poet Laureate Carol Ann Duffy to be published by Smith/Doorstop Books as part of their Laureate's Choice series. The published collection was called Pamper Me to Hell & Back.

In 2022 a Tweet posted by Bird in 2017 was ranked first on a list of the top New Zealand tweets of all time by The Spinoff.

Works

Poetry
 Hera Lindsay Bird (Victoria University Press, 2016) ISBN 9781776560714
Pamper Me to Hell & Back: Laureate's Choice 2018 (Smith/Doorstop Books, 2018)

References

External links

Bird's Twitter account
Hera Lindsay Bird's author page at Victoria University Press
"'Bisexuality', a Poem by Hera Lindsay Bird" on VICE
‘Keats is Dead so Fuck me From Behind’ by Hera Lindsay Bird

Living people
21st-century New Zealand poets
New Zealand women poets
1987 births
21st-century New Zealand women writers
People from Thames, New Zealand
International Institute of Modern Letters alumni